Abdur Rehman Rahi (6 May 1925 – 9 January 2023) was an  Kashmiri poet, translator and critic. He was awarded the Indian Sahitya Akademi Award in 1961 for his poetry collection Nawroz-i-Saba, the Padma Shri in 2000, and India's highest literary award, the Jnanpith Award (for the year 2004) in 2007. He is the first Kashmiri writer to be awarded the Jnanpith, India's highest literary award for his poetic collection Siyah Rood Jaeren  Manz (In Black Drizzle ). He was honored with Sahitya Akademi Fellowship in 2000 by Sahitya Akademi, New Delhi.

Life and career
Born in 1925, Rehman Rahi began his career as a clerk in the Public Works Department of the Government for few months in 1948 and was associated with the Progressive Writers' Association, of which he became the General Secretary. He also edited a few issues of Kwang Posh, the literary journal of the Progressive Writer's Association. He was later a sub-editor in the Urdu daily Khidmat. He did an M.A. in Persian (1952) and in English (1962) from Jammu and Kashmir University where he taught Persian. He was on the editorial board of the Urdu daily Aajkal in Delhi from 1953 to 1955. He was also associated with the Cultural wing of communist Party of Kashmir during his student days. As translator he did translation of Baba Farid's Sufi poetry to Kashmiri from Original Punjabi. Camus and Sartre are some visible effects on his poems while Dina nath Naadim's influence on his poetry is also visible especially in earlier works.

Rahi died on 9 January 2023, at the age of 97.

Published works
Rahi's major works include:
  Sana-Wani Saaz (poems) (1952)
 Sukhok Soda (poems)
 Kalam-e-Rahi (poems)
 Nawroz-i-Saba (poems) (1958)
 Kahwat (literary criticism)
 Kashir Shara Sombran
 Azich Kashir Shayiri
 Kashir Naghmati Shayiri
 Baba Fareed (translation)
 Saba Moallaqat
 Farmove Zartushtadia

References

External links
 Announcements of the Jnanpith award in The Hindu, Indian Express, and Greater Kashmir

1925 births
2023 deaths
People from Jammu and Kashmir
Kashmiri poets
Kashmiri people
Recipients of the Jnanpith Award
Recipients of the Sahitya Akademi Award in Kashmiri
People from Srinagar
Recipients of the Padma Shri in literature & education